Dalton station is a Via Rail request stop station on the Sudbury – White River train. It is located in the unincorporated place of Dalton in the Unorganized North Part of Algoma District, Ontario, Canada.

References

External links
Via Rail page for Dalton train station

Via Rail stations in Ontario
Railway stations in Algoma District
Canadian Pacific Railway stations in Ontario